In der Heimat, da gibt's ein Wiedersehn! (English: "We'll meet again in the Homeland") is a 1926 German silent film directed by Leo Mittler and Reinhold Schünzel. It shares its name with a popular song title.

The film's art direction is by Fritz Kraenke and Karl Machus.

Cast

References

Bibliography
 Ashkenazi, Ofer. Weimar Film and Modern Jewish Identity. Palgrave Macmillan, 2012.

External links

1926 films
1926 war films
German war films
Films of the Weimar Republic
Films directed by Leo Mittler
Films directed by Reinhold Schünzel
German silent feature films
UFA GmbH films
German black-and-white films
German World War I films
1920s German films
1920s German-language films
Silent war films